Mountain is a former provincial electoral division in Manitoba, Canada.  It was created for the 1879 provincial election, and was abolished shortly before the 1958 election.

Mountain was located in southwestern Manitoba, near Portage la Prairie.  The constituency was mostly rural, and included communities such as Baldur and Argyles.  Premier Dufferin Roblin once referred to the division's name as "curious", given that it marked by "the gentle landscape of the Pembina escarpment".

Several prominent Manitoba politicians represented Mountain, including Charles Cannon, Ivan Schultz and Premier Thomas Greenway.  The constituency was shaped like an "L" in the nineteenth century, and was sometimes called "Greenway's armchair".  For most of its history, Mountain was considered safe for the Manitoba Liberal Party and its successor, the Liberal-Progressive Party. But an effort was made to put forward an Independent third-party candidate in 1914.

In 1955, Mountain's population was estimated to be about 50% Anglo-Saxon, 33% French Canadian, and 16.5% Flemish.

Provincial representatives

References

Former provincial electoral districts of Manitoba